The Nayarit mouse or Sinaloan deer mouse (Peromyscus simulus) is a species of cricetid rodent endemic to Mexico. It was considered a subspecies of brush mouse until 1977.

Description
They typically also have a shorter snout than other members of the species group. They have tawny fur, with creamy-white underparts and a poorly-defined stripe of darker, almost black, fur down the middle of the back. The limbs are dusky to sooty, with white feet. The tail is hairy, usually darker above than below, and ends in a distinct tuft.

Distribution and habitat
The Nayarit mouse is found only along the Pacific coast of Mexico, from southern Sinaloa to central Nayarit. It inhabits forested terrain in coastal plains and river valleys below , including mangrove swamps, acacia thickets and thorn scrub. There are no recognised subspecies.

References

Peromyscus
Mouse, Nayarit
Mouse, Nayarit
Mouse, Nayarit
Natural history of Nayarit
Natural history of Sinaloa
Mammals described in 1904
Taxonomy articles created by Polbot